Sandy Creek is a town in Brunswick County, North Carolina, United States. The population was 260 at the 2010 census. It is part of the Myrtle Beach metropolitan area.

Geography
Sandy Creek is located in northern Brunswick County at  (34.287202, -78.153266).

Demographics

As of the census of 2000, there were 246 people, 91 households, and 64 families residing in the town. The population density was 411.2 people per square mile (158.3/km). There were 105 housing units at an average density of 175.5 per square mile (67.6/km). The racial makeup of the town was 91.87% White, 5.69% African American, 0.81% from other races, and 1.63% from two or more races. Hispanic or Latino of any race were 2.03% of the population.

There were 91 households, out of which 40.7% had children under the age of 18 living with them, 57.1% were married couples living together, 9.9% had a female householder with no husband present, and 28.6% were non-families. 24.2% of all households were made up of individuals, and 8.8% had someone living alone who was 65 years of age or older. The average household size was 2.70 and the average family size was 3.23.

In the town, the population was spread out, with 28.0% under the age of 18, 8.5% from 18 to 24, 31.7% from 25 to 44, 25.2% from 45 to 64, and 6.5% who were 65 years of age or older. The median age was 34 years. For every 100 females, there were 105.0 males. For every 100 females age 18 and over, there were 103.4 males.

The median income for a household in the town was $33,333, and the median income for a family was $40,625. Males had a median income of $27,500 versus $22,813 for females. The per capita income for the town was $14,296. About 9.0% of families and 8.5% of the population were below the poverty line, including 13.9% of those under the age of eighteen and none of those 65 or over.

References

Towns in Brunswick County, North Carolina
Towns in North Carolina
Cape Fear (region)